Mohammad Taqi Mirza Hessam os-Saltaneh (5 October 1791 – 1853) was a Persian Prince of the Qajar dynasty, son of Fath Ali Shah. He was Governor-General (beglerbegi) of Kermanshah and of Boroujerd.

Life
Mohammad Taqi Mirza (also written Mohammad Taghi Mirza) was born 5 October 1791 at Tehran as Fath Ali Shah's 7th son by the latter's temporary (sighe) wife Zeynab Khanom, daughter of Ali Mardan Khan Bakhtiari, supreme chief of the Chahar Lang division of the Bakhtiari tribe. Thus, he was one of the shah's twelve senior sons attending the official receptions at court depicted in several portraits. His only full sister was Princess Maryam Khanom (Fath Ali Shah's 5th daughter). 
In 1818 he commanded the attack on the Castle of Shirvan and his imperial father entitled him Hessam os-Saltaneh (lit. "Saber of the Monarchy"). After his eldest brother Mohammad Ali Mirza, the governor-general of Kermanshah, died from cholera in 1823 Mohammad Taqi Mirza was made 1826-1829 governor of that province. 1831-1834 he was made governor of Boroujerd. At his father's death in 1834 he was with some brothers imprisoned in the Ardabil citadel by the prime minister to avoid any attempts against the succession of the princes' nephew Mohammad Shah Qajar. He was released in 1848 by the next Qajar ruler Nasir al-Din Shah. Mohammad Taqi Mirza was also a poet under the pen name "Shokat".

Family

Marriages
Mohammad Taqi Mirza married four wives:
His first wife was the daughter of Hajji Mirza Ebrahim Khan "Mirza Shafi", sometimes prime minister to Fath Ali Shah. 
His chief and most prominent wife according to tribal customs of the Qajar house (galin khanom) was a daughter of Hossein Qoli Khan Donboli, the Khan of Khoy Khanate.
Additionally he married a Turkmen lady, and the daughter of Mirza Ahmad Khalifeh Soltani.

Offspring

Sons
 Abolfath Mirza
 Shoja ol-Molk Mirza
 Aurangzeb Mirza "Zibul 'Ulama"
 Abusaid Mirza
 Tahmoures Mirza
 Amir Teymur Mirza, his daughter married her cousin Prince Anoushiravan Mirza "Zia' od-Dowleh" eldest son of Bahman Mirza.
 Mohammad Safi Mirza
 Alamgir Mirza
 Jalal od-Din Mirza
 Sanjar Mirza
 Darab Mirza
 Amir Sheikh Mirza 
 Eshaq Mirza
 Kamran Mirza
 Abolhassan Mirza( Sheikh Reis Qajar)
 Habib Allah Mirza ( ? - oct. 1908, assassinated in Sari by Khalatbari rebels)
 Amir Hossein Mirza
 Haidar Mirza
 Ali Morad Mirza

Daughters
 Jahan Soltan Khanom, married her paternal cousin Prince Badi os-Zaman Mirza and had issued.
 Malek Soltan Khanom, married her paternal cousin Prince Bahman Mirza son of crown prince Abbas Mirza and had issued.

References

Sources

19th-century Iranian politicians
Qajar princes
1853 deaths
1791 births